Wang Huan is the name of

 Wang Huan (figure skater) (born 1983), Chinese figure skater
 Wang Huan (hurdler) (born 1994), Chinese sprinter
 Wang Huan (water polo) (born 1997), Chinese water polo player